Chapel of the Holy Cross is a chapel dedicated to the Christian Cross. Other names are Chapel of the Cross, Holy Cross chapel, and in German Heilig-Kreuz-Kapelle and Kreuzkapelle. 

 Chapel of the Holy Cross (Montmajour), France
 Holy Cross chapel, Mattancherry, India

Germany
 Heilig-Kreuz-Kapelle (Blieskastel), Saarland, Germany
 Kreuzkapelle, Bad Camberg, Hesse, Germany

United States
 Chapel of the Cross (Mannsdale, Mississippi)
 Chapel of the Cross (Chapel Hill, North Carolina), at University of North Carolina, Chapel Hill
 Chapel of the Holy Cross (Sedona, Arizona)
 Chapel of the Holy Cross (Holderness, New Hampshire), at Holderness School